Joseph Leo Birmingham (December 3, 1884 – April 24, 1946) was a major league baseball player. Birmingham was a center fielder and manager who occasionally played the infield for the Cleveland Naps.

Nap Lajoie, who was Birmingham's former manager, struggled through a hitting slump in mid-season and Birmingham decided to bench the future Hall of Famer at one point. Lajoie who had no love for Birmingham was outraged and cursed out the young manager to his face and in the press. The feud only ended when Lajoie was sold back to Philadelphia after the 1914 season.

He managed the Toronto Maple Leafs of the International League in 1916, but was replaced late in the season.

See also
List of Major League Baseball player–managers

References

External links

1884 births
1946 deaths
Sportspeople from Elmira, New York
Baseball players from New York (state)
Cornell Big Red baseball players
Cleveland Naps players
Cleveland Naps managers
Cleveland Indians managers
Toronto Maple Leafs (International League) managers
Major League Baseball center fielders
Amsterdam-Gloversville-Johnstown Jags players
Toronto Maple Leafs (International League) players
Reading Pretzels players
Toledo Iron Men players
Pittsfield Hillies players
Major League Baseball player-managers
Baseball coaches from New York (state)